Cryptogemma praesignis is a species of sea snail, a marine gastropod mollusk in the family Turridae, the turrids.

Description
The length of the shell attains 42 mm, its diameter 15 mm.

(Original description by E.A. Smith) The prominent row of tubercles around the middle of the whorls, the keel beneath the suture, and the broad sinus in the outer lip are the principal features of this species. The apex of the spire being broken away makes it impossible to state with certainty the exact number of whorls, but they would probably amount to eleven or twelve. The entire surface exhibits fine flexuous lines of growth.

(Original description by W.H. Dall) The solid shell contains six or more whorls (all the specimens are decollate). It is white, with an ashy pale-brown epidermis. The aperture measures less than half the length of the shell. The suture is distinct, not channeled The anal notch is rather anterior, about as deep as wide, separated from the suture behind by a somewhat excavated area. The spiral sculpture consists of, in front of the suture, a plain, strong thread, in front of that three or four anteriorly diminishing threads.  The anal fasciole, contrary to the ordinary rule, projects, showing two small distinct adjacent threads, which overrun and somewhat uodulate numerous short abrupt peripheral wavelets. In front of the fasciole three strong alternate with three feeble revolving threads, and still in front of these six or eight small threads occupy the base. The siphonal part is decorticated. The transverse sculpture is composed of the peripheral wavelets before alluded to, which are rather close set and about 21 in number, on the penultimate whorl. There is no other transverse sculpture except lines of growth, which are not very prominent. The aperture is narrow, with a relatively wide siphonal canal. The columella is solid, slender, and somewhat twisted. The body is not callous, and has no subsutural callosity. The interior of the aperture is not lirate.

Distribution
This marine species occurs off Hawaii and Sri Lanka

References

 Okutani T. (1964). Report on the archibenthal and abyssal gastropod Mollusca collected from Sagami Bay and adjacent waters by the R.V. Soyo-Maru during the years 1955–1963. Journal of the Faculty of Science, University of Tokyo, section 2. 15: 371–447, 7 pls.
 Kantor, Yu.I. & Sysoev, A.S. (1991a) Sexual dimorphism in the apertural notch of a new species of Gemmula (Gastropoda: Turridae). Journal of Molluscan Studies, 57, 205–209.

External links
 Martens E. von. (1901). Einige Neue Meer-Conchylien von der Deutschen Tiefsee-Expedition. Sitzungsberichte der Gesellschaft Naturforschender Freunde zu Berlin. (1901): 14-26
 Martens E. von. (1902). Einige neue Arten von Meer-Conchylien aus den Sammlungen der deutschen Tiefsee-Expedition unter der Leitung von Prof. Carl Chun, 1898–99. Sitzungs-Berichte der Gesellschaft naturforschender Freunde zu Berlin. (1902): 237–244., available online at https://biodiversitylibrary.org/page/7931397 page(s): 239
 Sowerby, G. B., III. (1903). Mollusca of South Africa. Marine Investigations in South Africa. 2(3): 213-232, pls 3-5.
 Zaharias P., Kantor Y.I., Fedosov A.E., Criscione F., Hallan A., Kano Y., Bardin J. & Puillandre N. (2020). Just the once will not hurt: DNA suggests species lumping over two oceans in deep-sea snails (Cryptogemma). Zoological Journal of the Linnean Society. DOI: 10.1093/zoolinnean/zlaa010/5802562
 

praesignis
Gastropods described in 1895